Few Against Many is the seventh studio album by Greek heavy metal band Firewind. It is the first album to feature ex-Nightrage and Meridian Dawn drummer, Johan Nunez. It was released on 21 May 2012 in Europe and 22 May in North America. This would be Firewind's last album with Apollo Papathanasio as their Vocalist before he decided to quit on 15 January 2013.

Track listing

Chart positions

Personnel

Band members
 Apollo Papathanasio – lead vocals
 Gus G. – lead guitar, backing vocals on "Wall of Sound"
 Petros Christodoulidis – bass
 Bob Katsionis –  keyboards, rhythm guitar
 Johan Nunez - drums

Guest Artists
 Apocalyptica - cellos on "Edge of a Dream"
 Staffan Karlsson - backing vocals
 Johan Edlund - backing vocals
 Dean Mess - backing vocals

References 

2012 albums
Firewind albums
Century Media Records albums